Cheryl Wheeler-Dixon (August 18, 1960 – February 12, 2020) was an American stunt woman, stunt double, and stunt driver in the US movie industry.  She was credited as Cheryl Wheeler-Duncan, Cheryl Wheeler, Cheryl M. Wheeler, and Sheryl Wheeler.  She was stunt double for Rene Russo, Kathleen Turner, and Goldie Hawn, among others.  She had two daughters, and with her husband, Lindsey Duncan, owned Genesis Today, Inc., a nutritional supplement company in Austin, Texas and a multi-level marketing offshoot called Genesis Pure. Cheryl Wheeler-Sanders (Dixon) and her husband, Robert Reed Sanders, were shot and killed in an apparent shoot-out with her ex-husband, Lindsey Duncan, in Yellow Springs, Ohio on February 12, 2020.

Early years
Cheryl Wheeler began studying Yoshukai Karate at fifteen years of age in Pensacola, Florida, with instructor Gerry Blanck. She began kickboxing when her instructor began training an amateur team, but her championship matches were considered professional, as she was paid for the work.  Wheeler-Dixon also studied Judo, Aikido, and grappling and trained for a while with kickboxer and actor Don Wilson. She was a three-time WKA World Kickboxing Champion with a record of 17-1-1 and a 2nd degree black belt in Yoshukai Karate.

Career
Wheeler-Dixon began work in the film industry in 1987 and maintained an extensive filmography of stunt work in such films as Back to the Future Part II, Bird on a Wire, Die Hard 2, Lethal Weapon 3 and sequel Lethal Weapon 4, Demolition Man, The Thomas Crown Affair and Charlie's Angels. She provided martial arts training to Rene Russo for the Lethal Weapon film series. Wheeler-Duncan  was inducted into Black Belt Magazine's Hall of Fame as 1996 Woman of the Year. With Chris Casamassa, she appeared on the cover and in a feature article in Black Belt Magazine in July 1997. Wheeler-Dixon received a Stunt Award for "Best Stunt Sequence" in the 2000 film Charlie's Angels.

Wheeler-Dixon was injured during the filming of Back to the Future II when she shattered her face and right wrist in a fall and required reconstructive surgery. In April 2010, she was featured on the cover and wrote an article for Healthy Living Magazine.  She also worked as a "stuntnastics" instructor and stunt performer at The Stunt Ranch in Austin, Texas.

In 2016, Cheryl's ex-husband, Robert "Lindsey" Duncan, filed a lawsuit against Sanders and her third husband Robert "Reed" Sanders, alleging Breach of Contract, Defamation, Breach of Fiduciary Duty, and Theft Liability Act requesting "monetary relief over $200,000 but not more than $1,000,000."

Death
Cheryl Wheeler-Sanders (Dixon) and her husband Robert Reed Sanders were both killed in what is described as an "ambush" and "shootout" with her ex-husband Robert Lindsey Duncan on his property in Yellow Springs, Ohio on February 12, 2020. Cheryl and her husband drove from their home in Leicester, North Carolina purportedly to confront Mr. Duncan about a college trust fund concerning their daughters. According to the Greene County, Ohio Sheriff, the Sanders set up wireless video cameras on a tree stump across the street from Duncan's property to monitor the activity there. On the morning of February 12, 2020, as Mr. Duncan and his wife, Molly, were returning home, they pulled into their driveway to be confronted by Robert Sanders. Mr. Sanders approached the vehicle, pointed a gun at Mrs. Duncan, and then turned the weapon on Mr. Duncan and fired several shots at which time Mr. Duncan, who is licensed to carry a concealed weapon, shot and killed Mr. Sanders. Cheryl Sanders, who was monitoring the live stream of the events on her cell phone from the wireless cameras, then pulled up to the driveway in her vehicle and opened fire upon Mr. Duncan. Mr. Duncan shot Mrs. Sanders, killing her. In a press conference given by the Greene County Sheriff, no charges were filed as the case was determined to be "justifiable homicide".

Kickboxing record (incomplete)

References

External links

Genesis Today
The Stunt Ranch
Dayton OH WDTN News article

American female karateka
American female kickboxers
American stunt performers
1960 births
Back to the Future (franchise)
2020 deaths
Sportspeople from Pensacola, Florida
Criminals from Florida
21st-century American women
Deaths by firearm in Ohio